The following is a list of episodes for the American television sitcom The Partridge Family. All four seasons have been released on DVD by Sony Pictures.

Series overview

Episodes

Season 1 (1970–71)

Season 2 (1971–72)

Season 3 (1972–73)

Season 4 (1973–74)

TV specials

References

 
 

Lists of American sitcom episodes
Episodes